Allahabad Solar Power Project is the first solar power plant in Uttar Pradesh. The plant has been developed by Kolkata-based company EMC Limited at Naini, 25 km away from Allahabad as part of Jawaharlal Nehru National Solar Mission. The plant is spread out over 25 acres of land.

See also 

 Solar power in India
 Renewable energy in India

References

Solar power stations in Uttar Pradesh
Allahabad district
Energy infrastructure completed in 2018
2018 establishments in Uttar Pradesh